Gerald "Jezz" Woodroffe (born October 28, 1951 in Birmingham) is an English keyboardist. He was a member of Belle Stars, Purusha, Sally Hope and Geezer Butler Band.

He played on the Technical Ecstasy album by Black Sabbath.  Although he is not given songwriting credit on the album, “He was present when Tony wrote material for “Technical Ecstasy, allowing Tony to try out ideas while Jezz supplied chords as accompaniment.”  Keyboards play a strong part in the style and texture of this album.

He performed live with the band, offstage, on the tours for the albums Sabotage and Technical Ecstasy.

Woodroffe also performed and recorded with Robert Plant and Phil Collins on the album Pictures at Eleven, made by the singer of Led Zeppelin.

In the early 1990s, Woodsroffe composed the music to two games by Horror Soft; Elvira II: The Jaws of Cerberus with Philip Nixon, and also composed the music to Waxworks.

In the 1970s, he was the owner of "Woodroffes" music store in Birmingham.

References

External links 
 Gerald Woodruffe on Discogs.com

English keyboardists
1951 births
Living people
Musicians from Birmingham, West Midlands
Video game composers